The Philippine expressway network, also known as the High Standard Highway Network, is a controlled-access highway network managed by the Department of Public Works and Highways (DPWH) which consists of all expressways and regional high standard highways in the Philippines.

High standard highways are defined as highways which provide a high level of traffic services by assuring high speed mobility and safe travel in order to vitally support socio-economic activities for sound socio-economic development of strategic regions and the country as a whole. In the Philippines,  controlled-access highways are known as expressways. They are multi-lane divided toll roads which are privately maintained under concession from the government. The regional high standard highways are partial controlled-access highways that function as supplementary to expressways.

Overview 

These highways, however, are mostly single and dual carriageways with many U-turn lanes and intersections slowing down traffic. Coupled with the increase in the number of vehicles and the demand for limited-access highways, the Philippine government requested the government of Japan to conduct a master plan for the development of a high standard highway network in 2009 under the Philippine Medium-Term Public Investment Plan (2005–2010). The plan calls for the promotion of national integrity by strengthening the Philippine Nautical Highway System linking roads and ferries, the decongestion of traffic in Metro Manila, and the improvement of accessibility to main tourist spots, among others.
 
The Philippine expressway network master plan covers the development of high standard highways surrounding Metro Manila in Luzon, Metro Cebu in the Visayas, and the Metro Davao–General Santos area in Mindanao.

Types
High standard highways in the Philippines are classified into two types: the arterial high standard highways or expressways, and regional high standard highways.

Expressways (HSH-1) 
Arterial high standards highways (HSH-1) in the Philippines are known as expressways. They are highways with limited access, normally with interchanges and may include facilities for levying tolls for passage in an open or closed system. Standard features of Philippine expressways include guard rails, rumble strips, signs and pavement markings, solid wall fence, speed radars, toll plaza, closed-circuit television and rest and service areas.

The first expressways in the Philippines are the North Luzon Expressway (NLEX) and the South Luzon Expressway (SLEX), both of which were built in the late 1960s. The first elevated toll road in the Philippines is the Skyway, with its construction consisting of numerous sections called "stages". Its latest section, Stage 3, was completed in 2021. The Southern Tagalog Arterial Road (STAR) Tollway, from Santo Tomas to Lipa in Batangas was opened in 2001 and was extended in 2008. The Subic–Clark–Tarlac Expressway (SCTEX), the longest tollway in the Philippines was opened in 2008, setting the stage for the development of the Tarlac–Pangasinan–La Union Expressway (TPLEX), which would extend beyond the SCTEX' northern terminus in Tarlac City. The TPLEX was opened in 2013. The Cavite–Laguna Expressway (CALAX), another expressway in Southern Luzon, was partially opened on October 30, 2019. The Central Luzon Link Expressway (CLLEX) was partially opened on July 15, 2021.

There are many under construction and proposed expressways in the Philippines. All the expressways in the Philippines are privately maintained under concession agreements either with the Department of Public Works and Highways or the Toll Regulatory Board through build–operate–transfer (BOT) arrangements. At present, there are 10 expressways in the Philippines that connect Metro Manila to northern and southern Luzon. Other expressways outside Luzon, such as the Cebu–Cordova Link Expressway, are under construction or in development.

Regional high standard highways (HSH-2)
Regional high standard highways in the Philippines are multi-lane arterial roads with bypass, grade separation and/or frontage road. They connect the expressways and are mostly partial controlled-access highways.

Numbering system 
Under the implementation of a route numbering system commissioned by the Department of Public Works and Highways (DPWH) on 2014, expressways are signed with yellow pentagonal signs with black numerals. They are prefixed with the letter "E" for "Expressway" to distinguish them from national highways. Expressways numbers are assigned sequentially and continuously.

Numbered routes 
The Philippine expressway network is currently consisting of six discontinuous network of expressways, all of which are located in the island of Luzon.

Unnumbered routes

Tolls
 
Most of the expressways implement tolls, usually of the closed road and barrier toll systems. On expressways roads using closed road tolling, motorists first get a card or ticket at the entry point and surrender them upon exit. On expressways implementing barrier tolling, toll collection is done at toll plazas on a fixed rate. Some expressways employ a hybrid system that includes both, like the North Luzon Expressway, which uses both barrier ("open system") and closed road tolling.

Electronic toll collection (ETC) is first implemented on the Skyway and South Luzon Expressway, using transponder technology branded E-Pass. ETC systems are implemented by some toll road operators, with inter-running support on other connected expressways. Toll plazas or toll gates have ETC lanes on the leftmost lanes or on "mixed" lanes, that allow cash collection, or both. Latest ETC systems use radio frequency identification (RFID) technology over transponder technology for collection. Having differing ETC systems that are not supported on other roads, a plan for a unified ETC system are promoted for motorists' convenience.

, the toll rates by expressway are as follows:

Luzon Spine Expressway Network 
A component of the expressway network or the High Standard Highway Network is the Luzon Spine Expressway Network (LSEN). It is a planned network of interconnected expressways within the island of Luzon. It is part of the Build! Build! Build! Infrastructure Plan of DuterteNomics.

In addition to the following expressways:
 C-5 Southlink Expressway
 Cavite–Laguna Expressway (CALAX)
 Central Luzon Link Expressway (CLLEX)
 Manila–Cavite Expressway (CAVITEX)
 Muntinlupa–Cavite Expressway (MCX)
 NAIA Expressway (NAIAX)
 NLEX Harbor Link
 North Luzon Expressway (NLEX)
 Metro Manila Skyway
 South Luzon Expressway (SLEX)
 Southern Tagalog Arterial Road (STAR Tollway)
 Subic Freeport Expressway (SFEX)
 Subic–Clark–Tarlac Expressway (SCTEX)
 Tarlac–Pangasinan–La Union Expressway (TPLEX)

New expressways will be built as well, such as:
 Cavite-Tagaytay-Batangas Expressway (CTBEX)
 North Luzon East Expressway (NLEE)
 NLEX–SLEX Connector Road
 NLEX Harbor Link (segments 10.1)
 Plaridel Bypass Road Phase II
 SLEX Toll Road 4 and 5
 Southeast Metro Manila Expressway (SEMME)
 Tarlac–Pangasinan–La Union Expressway (TPLEX) extension

Asian Highway Network 

The Asian Highway 26 passes through three expressways in the Philippines:
 North Luzon Expressway from Guiguinto, Bulacan to Balintawak Interchange, Quezon City;
 South Luzon Expressway from Magallanes Interchange, Makati to Calamba, Laguna; and 
 Skyway in Metro Manila.

See also

 Philippine highway network
 List of expressways in the Philippines
 Transportation in the Philippines
 List of bridges in the Philippines
 Philippine Nautical Highway System

Notes

References

External links
 South  Luzon  Expressway  Construction  Project

Roads in the Philippines
Philippines